The 1953–54 William & Mary Indians men's basketball team represented the College of William & Mary in intercollegiate basketball during the 1953–54 NCAA men's basketball season. Under the second year of head coach Boydson Baird, the team finished the season 9–14, 6–5 in the Southern Conference. This was the 49th season of the collegiate basketball program at William & Mary, whose nickname is now the Tribe. William & Mary played its home games at Blow Gymnasium.

The Indians finished in 5th place in the conference and qualified for the 1954 Southern Conference men's basketball tournament, held at the WVU Field House in Morgantown, West Virginia. However, the Indians fell to West Virginia in the quarterfinals.

Program notes
Following the previous season, seven of William & Mary's Southern Conference co-members departed for the new Atlantic Coast Conference: Clemson, Duke, Maryland, North Carolina, North Carolina State, South Carolina, and Wake Forest. As such, only 10 teams remained in the Southern Conference during the 1953–54 season.

Schedule

|-
!colspan=9 style="background:#006400; color:#FFD700;"| Regular season

|-
!colspan=9 style="background:#006400; color:#FFD700;"| 1954 Southern Conference Basketball Tournament

Source

References

William & Mary Tribe men's basketball seasons
William and Mary Indians
William and Mary Indians Men's Basketball Team
William and Mary Indians Men's Basketball Team